La Diligence can refer to:

 La Diligence (comics), an album in the Lucky Luke comics serie
 La Diligence (restaurant), Michelin starred restaurant in Beek, Netherlands

See also
 Diligence (disambiguation)